Samudrala Raghavacharya (19 July 1902 – 16 March 1968), also known as Samudrala Sr., was an Indian screenwriter, lyricist, playback singer, director, and producer known for his works in Telugu cinema. Samudrala Senior made his screen debut in 1937, and known for his collaborations with Ghantasala. grand son samudrala srinivaas

Personal life
Samudrala Raghavacharya was born in 1902, in Pedapulivarru, Repalle Taluk, Andhra Pradesh, India.

Filmography

Writer

 Kanakatara (1937) (debut) (dialogues and lyrics)
 Gruhalakshmi (1938)
 Vande Mataram (1939) (dialogue)
 Sumangali (1940) (dialogue)
 Devata (1941) (dialogue)
 Bhakta Potana (1942) (story and dialogue)
 Chenchu Lakshmi (1943) (story and dialogue)
 Garuda Garvabhangam (1943) (dialogue)
 Palnati Yudham (1947) (dialogue) (screen adaptation)
 Ratnamala (1947)
 Yogi Vemana (1947)
 Mana Desam (1949) (dialogue)
 Laila Majnu (1949/I) (adaptation) (dialogue)
 Swapna Sundari (1950)
 Navvite Navaratnalu (1951)
 Chandirani (1953)
 Bratuku Theruvu (1953) (dialogue) (story)
 Devadasu (1953) (dialogue and screen adaptation)
 Vipra Narayana (1954) (dialogues and lyrics)
 Donga Ramudu (1955) (lyrics)
 Jayasimha (1955) (dialogue) (story)
 Jayam Manade (1956) (dialogue) (story)
 Kanakatara (1956)
 Sarangadhara (1957) (adaptation) (dialogue)
 Vinayaka Chaviti (1957)
 Bhookailas (1958)
 Seetarama Kalyanam (1960) (dialogue)
 Batasari (1961) (screen adaptation, dialogues and lyrics)
 Lava Kusa (1963)
 Nartanasala (1963) (adaptation) (dialogue)
 Babruvahana (1964) (dialogue) (story)
 Pandava Vanavasam (1965)
 Sri Krishna Pandaveeyam (1966)
 Bhakta Prahlada (1967)
 Sri Krishnavataram (1967)
 Sree Ramakatha (1968)
 Veeranjaneya (1968)

Director
 Babruvahana (1964)
 Bhakta Raghunath (1960)
 Vinayaka Chaviti (1957)

Producer
 Devadasu (1953) (producer)
 Shanti (1952) (producer)
 Strisahasam (1951/I) (producer)

Playback singer
 Bhakta Raghunath (1960) (playback singer)

References

External links
 

Telugu writers
20th-century Indian film directors
Telugu film directors
Telugu screenwriters
Indian male screenwriters
1902 births
1968 deaths
People from Guntur district
Film directors from Andhra Pradesh
Screenwriters from Andhra Pradesh
20th-century Indian dramatists and playwrights
Film producers from Andhra Pradesh
Telugu film producers
Telugu playback singers
Indian male playback singers
Singers from Andhra Pradesh
20th-century Indian male writers
20th-century Indian male singers
20th-century Indian singers
20th-century Indian screenwriters